"Giving You the Benefit" is a song by American recording artist Pebbles from her second album Always (1990). Written and produced by Kenneth "Babyface" Edmonds and Antonio "L.A." Reid, the song was released as the lead single from Always on August 11, 1990 by MCA Records. It was her last top 5 pop hit on the Billboard Hot 100 Charts at #4 that year.

Credits and personnel 
 Perri "Pebbles" Reid – lead vocals, backing vocals, co-producer
 Kenneth "Babyface" Edmonds – writer, producer, keyboards, keyboard programming, backing vocals
 Antonio "L.A." Reid – writer, producer, drums, percussion, backing vocals
 Kevin "Kayo" Roberson – bass
 Donald K. Parks – synthesizer (Fairlight CMI)
 Natisse "Bambi" Jones – backing vocals
 After 7 – backing vocals

Charts

Weekly charts

Year-end charts

See also
List of number-one R&B singles of 1990 (U.S.)

References

1990 singles
Perri "Pebbles" Reid songs
Songs written by Babyface (musician)
Songs written by L.A. Reid
Song recordings produced by Babyface (musician)
MCA Records singles
1990 songs
Song recordings produced by L.A. Reid